Lancelot and Guinevere (known as Sword of Lancelot in the U.S.) is a British 1963 film starring Cornel Wilde, his real-life wife at the time, Jean Wallace, and Brian Aherne. This lesser-known version of the Camelot legend is a work shaped predominantly by Cornel Wilde, who co-produced, directed, co-wrote, and played Lancelot.

Plot
Lancelot is King Arthur's most valued Knight of the Round Table and a paragon of courage and virtue. Things change, however, when he falls in love with Queen Guinevere. A sub-plot concerns Arthur's effort to forestall a challenge from a rival king, a problem that will inevitably catch Lancelot up in a personal conflict.

In order to marry Guinevere, King Leodogran's daughter, King Arthur must find a knight to defeat Leodogran's champion. Arthur chooses Lancelot, who mortally wounds his opponent. On the way back to Camelot, Lancelot foils an attempt on Guinevere's life by Sir Modred, Arthur's illegitimate son; and before the end of the journey, Lancelot and Guinevere realize their love for each other. Though Lancelot is loyal to Arthur and Guinevere's marriage to the King takes place as planned, it is not long before the two become lovers.

Modred spies on them and informs Arthur of his wife's infidelity. Lancelot escapes, but Guinevere is condemned to be burned at the stake. He returns in time to save her and then offers to give himself up provided there will be no retaliation. Nevertheless, Arthur banishes him and sends Guinevere to a convent. Years later, Modred murders Arthur for his throne, and Lancelot returns to defeat him, thus ending the civil war that has been raging in Britain. He then finds Guinevere about to take the vows of a nun.

Cast
 Cornel Wilde as Sir Lancelot
 Jean Wallace as Guinevere
 Brian Aherne as King Arthur
 George Baker as Sir Gawaine
 Archie Duncan as Sir Lamorak
 Adrienne Corri as Lady Vivian
 Michael Meacham as Sir Modred
 Iain Gregory as Sir Tors
 Mark Dignam as Merlin
 Reginald Beckwith as Sir Dagonet
 John Barrie as Sir Bevidere
 Richard Thorp as Sir Gareth
 Joseph Tomelty as Sir Kaye
 Graham Stark as Rian

Comic book adaption
 Dell Movie Classic: Lancelot and Guinevere (October 1963)

References

External links
 
 
 

Love stories
1963 films
1960s fantasy adventure films
1960s historical romance films
1960s romantic fantasy films
British historical fantasy films
British fantasy adventure films
Arthurian films
Films shot at Pinewood Studios
Films directed by Cornel Wilde
Films scored by Ron Goodwin
Films adapted into comics
British historical romance films
1960s English-language films
1960s British films
Films with screenplays by Richard Schayer